USS William M. Wood has been the name of more than one United States Navy ship, and may refer to:

 , a destroyer escort cancelled in March 1944
 , a destroyer escort cancelled in June 1944
 , a destroyer in commission from 1945 to 1976

United States Navy ship names